Hiding Edith is a non-fiction children's book written by Kathy Kacer in 2006 and published by Second Story Press.  A French translation was published by Flammarion as Le Secret d'Edith.

The book describes the story of Edith Schwalb, a young Jewish girl hiding from the Nazis in France during World War II. Schwalb was born in Vienna, Austria, in 1932. She and her family left Austria as World War II approached and eventually made their way to southern France.

References 

2006 children's books
Non-fiction books about war
Canadian children's books
Works about women in war
Children's history books